Willi Holdorf (17 February 1940 – 5 July 2020) was a West German athlete.

Career
In 1964 he won the first Olympic medal for Germany in decathlon and was named German Sportspersonality of the Year. In 1997, he became a member of the German Olympic Committee, and in 2011 inducted into the German Sports Hall of Fame.

Holdorf was the German champion in 1961 and 1963 in decathlon, and in 1962 in the 200 m hurdles. He placed fifth in decathlon at the European Championships in 1962 and 1964. He was trained as a high-voltage electrician, but later worked as a sporting goods representative and a coach, both in athletics and football. He coached Olympic pole vaulter Claus Schiprowski, Reinhard Kuretzky and Günther Nickel, and later managed German Bundesliga side SC Fortuna Köln in football, where he could not avoid relegation.
At the Bobsleigh European Championships 1973 he was runner up in the two men competition.

Holdorf was the father of Dirk Holdorf, a former professional football player.

See also
Germany's Sports Hall of Fame

References

External links

 
 
 

1940 births
2020 deaths
People from Steinburg
Sportspeople from Schleswig-Holstein
German decathletes
Olympic gold medalists for the United Team of Germany
Athletes (track and field) at the 1964 Summer Olympics
Olympic athletes of the United Team of Germany
German football managers
Bundesliga managers
SC Fortuna Köln managers
Medalists at the 1964 Summer Olympics
Olympic gold medalists in athletics (track and field)